Lorenzo Ghielmi (born in Milan on 1 September 1959) is an Italian organist and harpsichordist.

He teaches old music at the Accademia Internazionale della Musica in Milan and at the "Schola Cantorum Basiliensis" in Basel. He was professor in Trossingen and at the Hochschule für Musik in Lübeck too. Ghielmi also played with Ensemble Il Giardino Armonico (in the first recordings). Ghielmi combines his concert activities with a Musicology. He has published works by Girolamo Frescobaldi.

External links
 Bach-cantatas.com
 
 Biography

Italian harpsichordists
Italian classical organists
Male classical organists
Italian performers of early music
Academic staff of Schola Cantorum Basiliensis
Living people
Place of birth missing (living people)
1959 births
21st-century organists
21st-century Italian male musicians
Winter & Winter Records artists